Anogeissus is a genus of trees in the family Combretaceae. The 10 to 12 species are distributed in Asia and tropical Africa.  Plants of the World Online now refers to this genus as a synonym of Terminalia L.

These are trees and shrubs with tubular flowers that lack petals and dry fruits with ridges or wings.

Axlewood (A. latifolia) is used for its wood and tannins and as a fodder. African birch (A. leiocarpa) is used for its wood and to make yellow dye and medicinal compounds. A yellow dyestuff produced from the leaves of the tree (A. schimperi) has traditionally been used in West Africa to dye leather.

Species include:
Anogeissus acuminata
Anogeissus bentii
Anogeissus dhofarica
Anogeissus latifolia
Anogeissus leiocarpa
Anogeissus pendula
Anogeissus rotundifolia
Anogeissus schimperi
Anogeissus sericea

References

 
Myrtales genera
Plant dyes